Nelson City Council is a unitary local authority. It has its headquarters in Nelson.

History 
Nelson City Council was created in 1992.

Local governance of Nelson began with Nelson Province in 1853, which covered the entire upper South Island. Provinces were abolished in 1876 and replaced with smaller counties and boroughs, including a Nelson Borough. In the 1989 local government reforms, Nelson was made part of the Nelson-Marlborough Regional Council, then in 1992 that regional council was split into multiple parts, including today's Nelson City Council.

Scope 

Nelson City Council's area covers the entire region of Nelson, covering 424 km2. Its population was 53,082 in 2018. It borders the Tasman and Marlborough Districts.

Councillors are elected for three year terms through local elections.

Current councillors 
The current mayor of Nelson is Nick Smith.

Nelson City councillors for the 2022–2025 term are:

 Matty Anderson
 Matthew Benge
 Trudie Brand
 Mel Courtney
 James Hodgson
 Rohan O'Neill-Stevens
 Kahu Paki Paki 
 Pete Rainey
 Campbell Rollo
 Rachel Sanson
 Tim Skinner
 Aaron Stallard

Work 
Environmental programmes undertaken by the council include Nelson Nature and Project Maitai. In 2019, the Council declared climate change an emergency situation.

References

External links
 Official website
 Top of the South Maps from Nelson City Council and Tasman District Council
 Nelson Nature
 Project Maitai

City councils in New Zealand
Politics of Nelson, New Zealand